Nevo Mizrahi (born 26 July 1987) is an Israeli footballer who plays for Hapoel Qalansawe.

References

External links
Profile at One

1987 births
Living people
Israeli Jews
Israeli footballers
Shimshon Tel Aviv F.C. players
Sektzia Ness Ziona F.C. players
Hapoel Marmorek F.C. players
F.C. Ashdod players
Hapoel Bnei Lod F.C. players
Hapoel Jerusalem F.C. players
Maccabi Yavne F.C. players
Maccabi Netanya F.C. players
Hapoel Kfar Saba F.C. players
Hapoel Ashkelon F.C. players
Maccabi Sha'arayim F.C. players
Nordia Jerusalem F.C. players
Maccabi Herzliya F.C. players
Hapoel Bik'at HaYarden F.C. players
Hapoel Qalansawe F.C. players
Israeli Premier League players
Liga Leumit players
Footballers from Yavne
Association football forwards